Implementation Science is an open access peer-reviewed academic journal in healthcare that was established in 2006. It focuses on studies of implementation research from the clinical, biomedical, social and health services sciences, as well as contributions on methodology and theory, selected reviews, essays, and invited editorials. The editors are Michel Wensing (University of Heidelberg) and Paul Wilson (University of Manchester). In 2018, the journal had an impact factor of 4.525, placing it #11 out of 98 journals in the category Healthcare Sciences & Services.

Abstracting and indexing 
The journal is abstracted and indexed in 
Citebase
Current Contents
 DOAJ
 EmCare
 MEDLINE
 OAIster
PubMed
PubMed Central
 Science Citation Index
Science Citation Index Expanded
 SCImago
 Scopus
Social Sciences Citation Index
 SOCOLAR
 Zetoc

References

External links 
 
 Print: 
 Online: 

Publications established in 2006
English-language journals
BioMed Central academic journals